The Porter Township School Corporation is the school system that serves students in kindergarten through twelfth grade from Porter Township in Porter County, Indiana, United States. Porter Township is primarily a rural area.

At the start of the 2013-2014 school year, Boone Grove High School entered the first year of its 1:1 program which gives each student their own device to perform school work on. While it started off with some issues, the program was ultimately a great success and led the other schools to become 1:1 as well. Currently, all grade levels in the district are fully 1:1 with each student having their own device.

Schools
 Porter Lake Elementary School (K-3)
 Kevin Donnell, Principal
 Boone Grove Elementary School (4-5)
 Edward Ivanyo, Principal
 Boone Grove Middle School (6-8)
 Bob Lichtenberger, Principal
 Boone Grove High School (9-12)
 Clay Corman, Principal

References

External links

School districts in Indiana
Education in Porter County, Indiana
1913 establishments in Indiana
School districts established in 1913